Artocarpus nigrifolius is a species of flowering plant in the genus Artocarpus. It is found in Yunnan.

References 

nigrifolius